The following outline is provided as an overview of and topical guide to environmental studies:

Environmental studies –

Fields of study

 Aquatic and environmental engineering
 Biomimetics (Biomimicry)
 Climatology
 Conservation biology
 Conservation movement
 Ecocriticism
 Ecological economics
 Ecological engineering
 Ecological genetics
 Ecological humanities
 Ecological literacy
 Ecological psychology
 Energy and environment
 Energy conservation
 Environmental archaeology
 Environmental chemistry
 Environmental degradation
 Environmental design
 Environmental economics
 Environmental effects on physiology
 Environmental engineering
 Environmental ethics
 Environmental finance
 Environmental geography
 Environmental geology
 Environmental history
 Environmental impact assessment
 Environmentalism
 Environmental issues
 Environmental justice
 Environmental law
 Environmental management
 Environmental monitoring
 Environmental movement
 Environmental organization
 Environmental philosophy
 Environmental psychology
 Environmental policy
 Environmental protection
 Environmental racism
 Environmental remediation
 Environmental restoration
 Environmental science
 Environmental sociology
 Environmental soil science
 Environmental studies
 Environmental technology
 Environmental toxicology
 Geomatics
 Green chemistry
 Green computing
 Green economy
  Green engineering
 Landscape architecture
 Natural resource management
 Fishing
 Hunting
 Hydrology
 Oceanography
 Pollutant
 Pollution
 Renewable energy
 Renewable resource
 Restoration ecology
 Sustainability science
 Sustainability studies
 Toxicology
 Traditional environmental knowledge
 Waste management
 Waste minimisation
 Whaling
 Wildlife conservation
 Wildlife management
 Wildlife observation

Degrees 

Primary undergraduate and graduate degrees in Environmental studies include the following.

Bachelors
 Bachelor of Arts in Environmental Studies BA  4sem

 Bachelor of Environmental Studies (BES)
 Bachelor of Science in Environmental Studies (BS)

Masters
 Master of Arts in Environmental Studies (MA)
 Master of Professional Studies in Environmental Studies (MPS)
 Master of Science in Environmental Studies (MS)

Doctoral
 Doctor of Philosophy in Environmental Studies (PhD)

Environmental education institutions and organizations 

Listed here are primary, secondary, and non-degree granting environmental education institutions and organizations.

 Arkansas Environmental Academy
 Canadian Centre for Environmental Education (CCEE)
 Dekalb Academy of Technology and Environment
 Earhart Environmental Magnet Elementary School
 Ecovillage Training Center (in Tennessee in the US)
 Environmental Campus Birkenfeld, Germany
 Environmental Charter High School
 Environmental Law Institute (ELI)
 European Academy of Environmental Affairs
 Fanling Environmental Resource Centre
 Jacobsburg Environmental Education Center
 Jane Goodall Center for Excellence in Environmental Studies
 Jane Goodall Environmental Middle School
 Jennings Environmental Education Center
 Jupiter Environmental Research and Field Studies Academy
 Kings Gap Environmental Education and Training Center
 Lancaster Environment Centre (LEC)
 London Environmental Education Forum (LEEF)
 Merry Lea Environmental Center
 NatureBridge (in California in the US)
 Nolde Forest Environmental Education Center
 Pine Jog Environmental Education Center
 Rachel Carson Center, Environmental Studies Certificate Programme, Munich Germany
 School of Environmental Studies, Minnesota
 School of Social Ecology
 Sigurd Olson Environmental Institute
 Southern Environmental Center
 Subject Centre for Geography, Earth and Environmental Sciences, UK
 Sunnyside Environmental School
 Sustainability Management School (SUMAS) (Switzerland)
 School of Planning and Architecture, New Delhi
 The School for Field Studies (SFS)
 Tokyo Global Engineering Corporation, Japan (global)

See also 

 Children's Environmental Exposure Research Study (CHEERS), USA
 Fourth International Conference on Environmental Education (2007), India
 Milthorpe Lecture, Macquarie University, Australia
 National Environmental Education Act (1990), USA
 North American collegiate sustainability programs
 Phase I environmental site assessment, USA
 Environmental groups and resources serving K–12 schools
 IB Group 4 subjects
 Index of environmental articles
 Outline of environmental journalism

Lists
 List of environment research institutes
 List of environmental design degree–granting institutions
 List of institutions awarding Bachelor of Environmental Science degrees
 List of institutions awarding Bachelor of Environmental Studies degrees
 List of years in the environment
  in the environment and environmental sciences

Organizations and networks
 Chartered Environmentalist
 Environmental Change Network (ECN)
 Natural Environment Research Council (NERC)
 Society for Environment and Education

References

Environmental studies
Environmental studies
Environmental studies